
Gmina Gawłuszowice is a rural gmina (administrative district) in Mielec County, Subcarpathian Voivodeship, in south-eastern Poland.

Villages
Gmina Gawłuszowice contains the villages and settlements of Brzyście, Gawłuszowice, Kliszów, Krzemienica, Młodochów, Ostrówek and Wola Zdakowska.

Neighbouring gminas
Gmina Gawłuszowice is bordered by the gminas of Borowa, Mielec, Osiek, Padew Narodowa, Połaniec and Tuszów Narodowy.

References
Polish official population figures 2006

Gawluszowice
Mielec County